Hasanpur is one of the 403 Legislative Assembly constituencies of Uttar Pradesh state in India.

It is part of Amroha district.

Members of Legislative Assembly
1957: Sukhan Lal, Indian National Congress
1957: Jagdish Prasad, Indian National Congress
1962: Sukhan Lal, Indian National Congress
1962: Jagdish Prasad, Indian National Congress
1967: R. Uddin, Indian National Congress
1969: Mahendra Singh, Bharatiya Kranti Dal
1974: Mahendra Singh, Bharatiya Kranti Dal
1977: Rama Shanker Kaushik, Janata Party
1980: Rais Uddin Warsi, Janata Party (Secular) Charan Singh
1985: Rama Shanker Kaushik, Indian Congress (J)
1989: Rifaqat Husain, Indian National Congress
1991: Tula Ram Siani, Bharatiya Janata Party
1993: Tula Ram Siani, Bharatiya Janata Party
1996: Rifaqat Husain, Samajwadi Party
2002: Devendra Nagpal, Independent
2007: Farhat Hasan, Bahujan Samaj Party
2012: Kamal Akhtar, Samajwadi Party

Election results

2022

2017

See also
 List of constituencies of the Uttar Pradesh Legislative Assembly
 Amroha district

References

External links
 Official Site of Legislature in Uttar Pradesh
Uttar Pradesh Government website
UP Assembly
 

Assembly constituencies of Uttar Pradesh
Amroha district